His Honour John Arnold Baker DL (5 November 1925 – 13 June 2016) was a British judge and a Liberal Party politician.

Background
Baker was born in Calcutta the son of William Sydney Baker, MC and Hilda Dora Swiss. He was educated at Plymouth College, Wellington School, Somerset and Wadham College, Oxford where he received a Master of Arts. In 1954 he married Edith Muriel Joy Heward. They had two daughters. In 1986 he was appointed a Deputy Lieutenant for Surrey.

Professional career
In 1943 at the age of 18 Baker joined the Royal Naval Volunteer Reserve. After university in 1951 he was admitted as a solicitor. In 1955 he had published 'The Young Lawyer' written with J. L. Clay and John Beeching Frankenburg. In 1960 he received a Call to the Bar, by Gray's Inn. In 1972 he became a Recorder. In 1973 he became a Circuit Judge. He retired in 1998 at the age of 73. In 1986 he became President of the Medico-Legal Society, serving for two years.

Political career
At University Baker got active in politics and was treasurer of the Oxford Union from 1947 to 1948. He joined the Liberal Party and was active in the party's youth wing. In 1952 he became chairman of the National League of Young Liberals, serving a one-year term. He also became active in the senior party at a national level. He was elected a member of the Liberal Party National Executive. 
He was Liberal candidate for the Richmond division of Surrey at the 1959 General Election;

He was again Liberal candidate for the Richmond division of Surrey at the 1964 General Election;

He did not contest the 1966 General election. In 1968 he became a Vice-President of the Liberal Party. In 1969 he was elected Chairman of the Liberal Party National Executive. He was Liberal candidate for the Dorking division of Surrey at the 1970 General Election. 

He did not stand for parliament again. He was involved with the Apex Trust becoming a Trustee in 2002 and a Patron in 2006.

In 2005 his memoirs entitled 'Ballot Box to Jury Box' were published. Baker died in June 2016 at the age of 90.

References

1925 births
2016 deaths
Alumni of Wadham College, Oxford
Deputy Lieutenants of Surrey
Liberal Party (UK) parliamentary candidates
Royal Naval Volunteer Reserve personnel of World War II